Wersi is a German manufacturer of electronic organs, keyboards and pianos (named after the communes of Werlau and Simmern in Rhineland-Palatinate). They were used by organists such as Franz Lambert and the late Klaus Wunderlich. 

Wersi's current range of instruments is powered by the Open-Architecture-System (OAS). This is a GUI that runs on top of a Windows XP computer, enabling the keyboard to support third-party programs, such as music notation programs, software synthesizers, and digital audio workstations.

History
Wersi is a company that began in Germany. In 1969 two brothers, Wilhelm-Erich und Reinhard Franz (W.E & R. Franz), worked in the basement of their parents' house to produce their first instruments. 

By the 1970s, the company had established a successful kit development system, that allowed customers to build instruments in their own home.

In the 1980s two factories were constructed in the Wersi-hometown of Halsenbach, Rhineland-Palatinate.

In the 1990s, Wersi developed the digital Grand Piano line as well as digital sample based instruments.

In the late 1990s, Wersi developed the OX7 drawbar module.

In 2010, Wersi was purchased by the European musical distribution company, Music Store Professional as the official distributor and by the Chinese musical instruments producer, Medeli. The new Pegasus Wing keyboard was launched at the Musikmesse Frankfurt in April 2011. This event was the world premier of the new Wersi keyboard line, made in the facilities of Chinese keyboard manufacturer Medeli. Organs are still assembled in Germany, and development has been moved to the Music Store facility in Cologne.

References

External links
 Wersi Netherlands home page
 Wersi USA home page
 Wersi international home

Electronic organ manufacturing companies
Musical instrument manufacturing companies of Germany
Companies based in Rhineland-Palatinate